Carl Fredrik Ralph Alexander Enckell (13 May 1913, in Helsinki – 18 May 2001, in Helsinki) was a Finnish diplomat.

Enckell was  employed by the Ministry for Foreign Affairs since 1934. He was Secretary of State in Stockholm from 1944 to 1945, in Paris from 1945 to 1950 and in Moscow from 1950 to 1954, and as Head of the Political Department of the Ministry of Foreign Affairs between 1955 and 1959.

Enckell served as Permanent Representative of Finland to the United Nations from 1959 to 1965, Ambassador to Stockholm 1965-1969, OECD Representation in Paris 1969-1976, continued at the Finnish Embassy in Paris, at the same time in Unesco 1972-1976 and in Warsaw from 1976 to 1980. Enckell's successor as Head of the Political Department of the Ministry for Foreign Affairs, Ambassador of the United Nations and Ambassador to Stockholm was Max Jakobson.

Ralph Enckell received the Special Envoy and Plenipotentiary title in 1957 and was honored as Honorary Professor of Political Science at the University of Turku in 1970. His exceptional merit as a diplomat was awarded in 1978 by the  Order of the Lion of Finland.

Enckell was known in the diplomatic circles as a colorful person. When the Vietnam War was widely criticized by the Swedish Minister of Education, later Prime Minister Olof Palme condemned the occupation of Czechoslovakia in 1968, Enckell categorically characterized the difference between the neutrality policy of Sweden and Finland: ”Finland seeks to manage its relations both east and west as well, Sweden as badly.”

Enckell's words  burst into Palme's ears in time, and he was deeply frustrated with his mind. According to Ilkka Pastinen, Enckell was temperamental and demanding, with an emphasized patriotic and many feared superior.

Enckell starred under the pseudonym Ilmari Mänty in Nyrki Tapiovaara's film The Stolen Death in 1938. However, his remained the only movie which he acted.

He was married twice: between 1936 and 1948, Marie-Christine Söderhjelm and 1949 until his death with Laura Virkkusen (Snellman until 1935). Academician Rabbe Enckell was the little brother of Ralph Enckell's father.

In addition to his mother tongue Swedish, Enckell perfectly controlled Finnish, English, French and Russian. His language skills were largely already canceled by the childhood home: his father, Carl Enckell, was a Swedish-speaking diplomat and  English-born mother Lucy Marie Frieda Agathe Margareta Ponsonby-Lyons.

During his father's Envoy career in  Paris in the 1920s, Ralph had attended a French school. While working in the 1950s at the Embassy of Finland in Moscow, Enckell thoroughly studied Russian. Ralph was Lieutenant General Oscar Enckell's nephew.

In 2013, when one hundred years after the birth of Ralph Enckell, a biography of Markku Reimaa was published by the Magician of the Diplomacy.

References 

Ambassadors of Finland to Sweden
Ambassadors of Finland to France
Ambassadors of Finland to Poland
Permanent Representatives of Finland to the United Nations
1913 births
2001 deaths
Finnish people of English descent
Swedish-speaking Finns